The list of threatened fauna of Michigan includes almost 400 endangered, threatened and special concern species that are located in Michigan as a part of the fauna of the United States. Endangered and threatened species in Michigan are protected through the Endangered Species Act of the State of Michigan, part of the 1994 Michigan Natural Resources and Environmental Protection Act. The list was last updated in 2009 to its sixth iteration. At this time, 69 new species were added, including many species of freshwater mussels and snails, and 13 species were removed. The state also recognizes species of special concern, which are not protected under the act. These species have low or declining numbers in the state or a need for additional information on their populations in Michigan. If the species' numbers decline, they are moved to threatened or endangered status and afforded protection under the act; if they increase, they are removed from the list without further action.

Threatened and endangered species can also be listed under the federal Endangered Species Act, passed in 1973; the act covers over 1,250 plant and animal species. Species can be on either list or both lists – representation on one does not automatically determine representation (or status) on the other.

A large portion of the field surveys and research conducted with regards to threatened and endangered species in Michigan is undertaken by the Michigan Natural Features Inventory (MNFI) program. The MNFI program was originally developed in 1980 as part of the state natural heritage programs conceptualized by The Nature Conservancy (TNC), through which it received its first funding. The MNFI program severed relations with TNC in 2000, and became a program of the Michigan State University Extension Services.

Mammals
There are twelve species of threatened mammals in Michigan. Five of these are listed as species of threatened concern, three as threatened and four as endangered. Two also have federal listed status as endangered or threatened.

Amphibians

There are five species and subspecies of threatened amphibians in Michigan. Two of these are listed as species of special concern, one as a threatened species and two as endangered. No amphibians with federally listed threatened status have populations in Michigan.

Reptiles

There are eleven species and subspecies of threatened reptiles in Michigan. Of these, six are listed as species of special concern, three as threatened and two as endangered. One species has federal listed status as threatened, while another is a candidate for federal listing.

Birds

There are 42 threatened species and subspecies of birds in Michigan. Of these, 18 are listed as species of special concern, 14 as threatened and 9 as endangered. One additional species is listed as extinct in Michigan, although it previously had a population in the state. Two species have federal listed status as endangered.

Fish

There are 35 species and subspecies of threatened fish in Michigan. Of these, eight are species of special concern, nine are threatened and another nine are listed as endangered. An additional nine species that previously had populations in Michigan are now considered extinct in that state. None of the federally listed species of threatened fish have populations in Michigan.

Insects

Butterflies and moths

There are 53 species and subspecies of threatened butterflies and moths in Michigan. Of these, 40 are listed as species of special concern, 8 as threatened and 5 as endangered. Two species are also listed as federally endangered, while another is a candidate for federal listing.

Beetles

There are six species of threatened beetles in Michigan. Of these, three are species of special concern, one is threatened and one is endangered. One additional species is extinct in Michigan, although it previously had a viable population in the state. Two species of beetles with populations in Michigan are listed as federally endangered.

Cicadas and hoppers

There are seven species of threatened cicadas and hoppers with populations in Michigan. Of these, five are listed as species of special concern and two as threatened species. There are no federally listed species with populations in Michigan.

Damselflies and dragonflies

There are 15 species of threatened damselflies and dragonflies in Michigan. Of these, twelve are listed as species of special concern, two as threatened and one as endangered. The state-listed endangered species is also listed as federally endangered.

Grasshoppers and crickets

There are 14 species of threatened grasshoppers and crickets in Michigan. Thirteen of these are listed as species of special concern, while the remaining species is listed as threatened. There are no federally listed species with populations in Michigan.

Bees

There are two species of threatened bees in Michigan, both of which are members of the genus Bombus and are listed as species of special concern. There are no federally listed bee species with populations in Michigan.

Caddisflies

There is one species of threatened caddisfly in Michigan, which is listed as a species of special concern and is not found on the federal listing of endangered species.

Dobsonflies and fishflies

There is one species of threatened dobsonfly in Michigan and no species of threatened fishflies. The single threatened member of this group is listed as a species of special concern, and is not found on the federal listing.

Mayflies

There are three species of threatened mayflies with populations in Michigan, all of which are listed as species of special concern. None are found on the federal listing.

Freshwater mussels

There are 28 species and subspecies of threatened freshwater mussels in Michigan. Of these, 9 are species of special concern, 6 are listed as threatened and 13 are endangered. Six are also federally listed as endangered.

Land and freshwater snails

There are 61 species and subspecies of threatened land and freshwater snails in Michigan. Of these, 38 are species of special concern, 10 are listed as threatened and 13 are listed as endangered. No federally listed species of snails have populations in Michigan.

Fingernail and pea clams

There are seven threatened species of fingernail and pea clams in Michigan, all listed as species of special concern. None of the species with populations in Michigan are federally listed as threatened.

See also
 List of fauna of Michigan

Notes

References
General

 

Specific

Threatened
Michigan
Fauna,Michigan